The Violin Concerto No. 2 is a composition for violin solo and orchestra by the Finnish composer Magnus Lindberg.  The work was jointly commissioned by the London Philharmonic Orchestra, the Berlin Philharmonic, Swedish Radio Symphony Orchestra, Radio France, and New York Philharmonic.  Its world premiere was given by the violinist Frank Peter Zimmermann and the London Philharmonic Orchestra under the direction of Jaap van Zweden at Royal Festival Hall, London, on December 9, 2015.  The piece is dedicated to Zimmermann.

Composition
The concerto has a duration of approximately 25 minutes and is cast in three movements played without pause.

Instrumentation
The work is scored for solo violin and an orchestra consisting of two flutes (2nd doubling piccolo), two oboes, two clarinets, bass clarinet, two bassoons, four horns, two trumpets, three trombones, timpani, two percussionists, harp, celesta, and strings.

Reception
The concerto has received a positive response from music critics.  Reviewing the world premiere, Ivan Hewett of The Daily Telegraph compared the work favorably to Lindberg's Violin Concerto No. 1, saying:

Richard Fairman of the Financial Times wrote:

Reviewing the New York City premiere, James R. Oestreich of The New York Times similarly observed:

Sean Piccoli of the New York Classical Review was more critical of the piece, however, remarking:

References

Concertos by Magnus Lindberg
2015 compositions
Lindberg 2
Music dedicated to ensembles or performers
Music commissioned by the Berlin Philharmonic
Music commissioned by the London Philharmonic Orchestra
Music commissioned by the New York Philharmonic
Music commissioned by Radio France
Music commissioned by the Swedish Radio Symphony Orchestra